C20 is a tarred highway in southern Namibia. It starts in Hardap and ends in Gobabis. The road travels past Aranos and Stampriet.

References

Roads in Namibia
ǁKaras Region